Parliamentary elections were held in Croatia on 8 November 2015. All 151 seats in the Parliament were up for election. This parliamentary election was the 8th since the first multi-party election  in 1990 and the first since Croatia joined the European Union in 2013. The ruling center-left Croatia is Growing coalition, led by Prime Minister Zoran Milanović, was challenged by the center-right Patriotic Coalition led by the HDZ and headed by its party chairman Tomislav Karamarko, and also faced several new political coalitions.

The elections produced a hung parliament, with the ruling Croatia is Growing coalition winning 56 seats in the 10 electoral constituencies within Croatia and 3 of the 8 representatives of national minorities (Ermina Lekaj-Prljaskaj and Veljko Kajtazi are members of HNS and Sándor Juhász is a member of SDP). The opposition Patriotic Coalition won 56 seats within Croatia and all three seats allocated to Croatian citizens living abroad, winning 59 seats, technically tying with the ruling coalition. The IDS-PGS-RI coalition was expected to side with Croatia is Growing, as well as the remaining 5 minority representatives, giving Prime Minister Milanović's coalition 67 seats to 59 for Karamarko's opposition coalition. This left Milanović 9 seats short of a majority, while Karamarko needed 17 seats.

The third-placed MOST led by Metković mayor Božo Petrov, which won 19 seats, was expected to be the deciding factor in the formation of the next government of Croatia. After the election Drago Prgomet of MOST stated that neither Milanović nor Karamarko would be their choice for Prime Minister and that MOST will decide on who will head the 13th government of Croatia. Some within MOST had stated they prefer the formation of a national unity government made up of HDZ, SDP and MOST, though this was considered extremely unlikely. On 11 November Patriotic coalition leader Karamarko openly rejected the prospect of an HDZ-SDP-MOST government. This was followed by more than 45 days of negotiations between all three coalitions.

On 22 December it was stated that Croatia is Growing would form a government with MOST, however, on 23 December, MOST decided to give its support to a government with the HDZ. The coalition was further supported by Milan Bandić 365 and two independent minority representatives, giving them a slim majority of 78 seats in Parliament, two more than the required 76 seats. They nominated a Croatian-Canadian businessman named Tihomir Orešković, who was generally unknown to the public and who had spent most of his life in Canada, to be the next Prime Minister. A new government finally took office on 22 January 2016 with Orešković as the 11th Prime Minister, after a record 76 days of negotiations.

Background

The 2011 general election was held on 4 December 2011 and resulted in the victory of the center-left Kukuriku coalition led by the Social Democratic Party and supported by the Croatian People's Party – Liberal Democrats, Croatian Party of Pensioners and the Istrian Democratic Assembly. The largest opposition party is the center-right Croatian Democratic Union. Other smaller opposition parties are the Croatian Labourists – Labour Party and the Croatian Democratic Alliance of Slavonia and Baranja.

The previous 7th Assembly of the Croatian Parliament was dissolved on 28 September 2015, with the President of Croatia Kolinda Grabar-Kitarović subsequently being tasked with scheduling the elections on a Sunday within 60 days of the dissolution.

Electoral system
Elections were held in 10 electoral districts inside Croatia each with a roughly equal number of registered voters and 14 seats, supplemented by one electoral district for Croatian citizens living abroad (3 seats), and one electoral district for national minorities (8 seats). Parties or alliances had to pass a 5% threshold in each electoral district in order to qualify for seats, which were then distributed proportionally between the qualified lists using the D'Hondt method. As voters were allowed to select both a list and a candidate from it, the ranking of candidates on the list was superseded by voter selection wherever candidates got at least 10% of the list's votes.

Electoral law amendments
In February 2015 the Croatian parliament voted to amend the country's election rules by introducing a number of changes, most importantly introducing an element of preferential voting by letting candidate selection function as a most open list system for candidates receiving a minimum of 10%, while keeping list ranking for those that do not meet this quota. In addition there were several other changes, including a gender quota, a ban on convicted criminals running, new rules for monitoring of the elections, changes to the way media covers elections etc. The proposal came from the ruling Social Democratic Party as well as several other minor changes. The opposition left Parliament and did not participate in the voting process. However, on 25 September 2015 the Constitutional Court of Croatia ruled that some of the changes to the electoral law were unconstitutional, including a ban on criminals convicted for misuse of position running for office, while maintaining this ban for other offences, an electoral list quota of 40% candidates of each gender and an obligation to collect 1,500 signatures for a political party to run in an electoral district.

Political parties

Opinion polls

Results

On November 9, 2015 State Election Commission published only the provisional official results from the 99.9% of regular polling stations because elections were repeated in 7 polling stations due to irregularities on election day. Final results were announced on 24 November.

Centre-right Patriotic Coalition won 59 seats, centre-left Croatia is Growing coalition 58 (2 national minority representatives side with the Croatian People's Party - Liberal Democrats), centre Bridge of Independent Lists 19, centre-left Istrian Democratic Assembly 3, right wing Croatian Democratic Alliance of Slavonia and Baranja and centre Milan Bandić 365 - The Party of Labour and Solidarity 2 each, centre Human Blockade and centre People's Party - Reformists 1 each. As for the 8 mandates of minority representatives, 3 go to Croatia is Growing because those representatives are members of HNS party or its parliamentary club, while Independent Democratic Serb Party that won 3 seats confirmed that it would negotiate with Croatia is Growing. In addition, Istrian Democratic Assembly also confirmed that it would negotiate only with Croatia is Growing.

A total of 17 parties won representation in the 8th assembly of the Croatian Parliament: HDZ (51), SDP (42 + 1 representative of national minorities), MOST (19), HNS (9 + 2 national minority representatives), Labourists (3), IDS (3), HSP-AS (3), HSU (2), HSLS (2), Bandić Milan 365 (2), HDSSB (2), BUZ (1), HSS (1), Human Blockade (1), HRAST (1), HDS (1) and Reformists (1).  Such a fractured political situation meant that forming a stable majority that would serve a full 4-year term would be a challenge. Furthermore, the total number of MOST's seats in Parliament, who held the balance of power, fell from 19 to 15 within months of election day, namely Drago Prgomet, who was expelled from MOST only four days after the election, founded his own party Croatian Dialogue Initiative (HRID), which two more MOST parliamentarians soon jointed, while Stipe Petrina another MOST MP became an independent.

National minorities elected 8 representatives through a separate election system: Milorad Pupovac (75,9% of votes), Mile Horvat (59,2%) and Mirko Rašković (54,4%) for the Serb national minority, Sándor Juhász (50,2%) for the Hungarian minority, Furio Radin (65,8%) for the Italian minority, Vladimir Bilek (75,7%) for the Czech and Slovak minorities, Veljko Kajtazi (41,4%) for the Austrian, Bulgarian, German, Jewish, Polish, Roma, Romanian, Rusyn, Russian, Turkish, Ukrainian, Vlach minorities and Ermina Lekaj Prljaskaj (21,1%) for the Albanian, Bosniak, Macedonian, Montenegrin and Slovene minorities.

Minority seats

Distribution of seats by electoral district

Government formation
According to official results the ruling Croatia is Growing coalition won 56 seats, amounting to 59 due to the coalition with IDS. The opposition Patriotic Coalition and MOST (Croatian for bridge) were the second and third largest blocs, respectively. MOST has stated that it will not enter into coalition with either of the two largest blocs and that it will instead present its own candidate for prime minister. On 12 November, MOST MP Drago Prgomet was expelled from the party for holding private talks with Prime Minister Zoran Milanović without the knowledge of other members of the party's leadership.

There are four possible outcomes: HDZ forms a coalition with MOST, SDP forms a coalition with MOST, forming of a coalition between HDZ and SDP, and called a new election. Jutarnji reported that Milanović is closer to gaining the 76 seats needed for a majority in parliament than Tomislav Karamarko, the former having reportedly gained the support of IDS and the eight MPs elected by national minorities. It was also reported that Milan Bandić, whose party won two seats, as well as Radimir Čačić of Forward Croatia! - Progressive Alliance are also more likely to support Milanović. The regional party HDSSB is considered very unlikely to support a Patriotic Coalition government due to animosity on the local level (although they are ideologically closer), but they might support Croatia is Growing in a minority government. The first round of talks on the formation of the next government, held on 26 November at the Presidential palace proved inconclusive, with none of the leaders of parliamentary parties presenting the required 76 MPs needed for the naming of a Prime Minister-designate. President Kolinda Grabar-Kitarović called the first session of the eighth assembly of parliament for 3 December and set the date for new talks on 7 December. On 27 November, Milanović offered the position of Speaker of Parliament to MOST chairman Božo Petrov, who declined stating that he was not interested in holding a position, but rather for reforms to be agreed upon first. On 23 December, the Patriotic Coalition, MOST, Milan Bandić 365 - The Party of Labour and Solidarity and two minority representatives (Ermina Lekaj-Prljaskaj and Mirko Rašković) agreed upon non-partisan candidate Tihomir Orešković as prime minister-designate. Orešković presented the 78 signatures of support to Grabar-Kitarović, upon which she gave him the task of forming a new government and called the second attempt at constituting the parliament for 28 December.Željko Reiner was elected Speaker on 28 December with 88 votes in favor, 62 abstentions and 1 against, thus constituting the 8th Assembly of Parliament 50 days after the elections were held. The confirmation of the cabinet to be led by Tihomir Orešković took place on 22 January 2016. After a 14-hour parliamentary debate the new government was supported by a majority of 83 out of 151 parliamentary representatives. Zoran Milanović handed over the office of Prime Minister to Tihomir Orešković at 23:55 pm on the same day. This ended a record-breaking 76 days of negotiations that began on 9 November 2015.

Notes

References

External links
Official results by State Election Committee (Interactive Map)

Elections in Croatia
Croatia
Parliamentary
Croatia
2015 elections in Croatia